Fast Rules is a simple, playable ruleset for conducting table top wargames with H0 scale World War II miniatures using armor, artillery and infantry and classed as a "mid-level skirmish" wargame.  The rules were developed by Mike Reese and Leon Tucker and published as a 24 page pamphlet in 1970 by the Armored Operations Society, an affiliate of the IFW.  Guidon Games made a second printing in 1972 and a third printing at an unknown later date.
 Combat Rules released an full-color, authorized edition in 2021 with a few additions. Compared to the original 5.5x8.5" edition, it has 24 6.14x9.21" pages.

The basic target types are buildings, tanks, armored personnel carriers, trucks, cars, guns, and men. Two six-sided dice are rolled to determine whether a hit is made, with the number needed to score a hit depending upon the target type.  The chance of hitting increases with each consecutive attempt, and if a hit is scored a second roll is made to determine if the target is destroyed.  When opposing infantry come into contact with each other, each man rolls a single six-sided die to determine survival.

From the introduction page of the rules:
These rules have been compiled especially to introduce collectors of HO scale military miniatures to the rewarding hobby of conducting small battles with their collections.  Utmost simplicity has been the constant concern of the authors in order that the rules might be easily learned and quickly put to use.  The rules carefully select those aspects of combat which were of fundamental importance in the Second World War, and deliberately ignore many subtle points.  Apart from a modest collection of inexpensive miniature vehicles and figures and this booklet, you will need only a pair of dice and a tape measure or ruler marked in feet and inches.

Fast Rules is not a perfect information game.  A player must actively seek out his opponent's pieces, which are not placed on the battlefield until they are detected.

Reese and Tucker also wrote Tractics, a more elaborate set of rules for World War II miniatures.

References

Collectible miniatures games
Guidon Games games
Miniature wargames
Playscale miniaturism